The Brazilian Chemical Society is a not for profit organization that supports Chemistry in Brazil. It was founded in 1977.

It publishes the Journal of the Brazilian Chemical Society.

References

External links 

 
 

Chemistry societies
1977 establishments in Brazil
Learned societies of Brazil